Aadowal Jhelum  is a village and union council of Jhelum District in the Punjab province of Pakistan. It is part of Pind Dadan Khan Tehsil.

References

Populated places in Tehsil Pind Dadan Khan
Pind Dadan Khan Tehsil
Jhelum District